Samoana hamadryas, common name the "Polynesian tree snail", is a species of tropical, air-breathing land snail, a terrestrial, pulmonate, gastropod mollusc in the family Partulidae. This species is endemic to Raivavae, Austral Islands, French Polynesia.

References

H
Fauna of French Polynesia
Molluscs of Oceania
Critically endangered fauna of Oceania
Gastropods described in 1953
Taxobox binomials not recognized by IUCN